Metablus is a genus of beetles in the family Carabidae, containing the following species:

 Metablus paracenthesis (Motschulsky, 1839)
 Metablus solskyi Komarov, 1995

References

Lebiinae